Xestia hypographa is a moth of the family Noctuidae. It is only known from the north-western part of the Tien-Shan Mountains.

The wingspan is 32–34 mm.

External links
A Revision of the Palaearctic species of the Eugraphe (Hübner, 1821-1816) Generic complex. Parti. The genera Eugraphe and Goniographa (Lepidoptera, Noctuidae)

hypographa
Moths of Asia